The Shemakha Governorate was a province (guberniya) of the Caucasus Viceroyalty of the Russian Empire, with its administrative center in the city of Shemakha (present-day Shamakhi). Following the earthquake of 1859, the capital was transferred and the province became known as the Baku Governorate.

History 

Following the catastrophic 1859 Shamakhi earthquake, the capital of the governorate was transferred from Shemakha to the fast-growing city of Baku, for-which the governorate's name was changed accordingly.

Administrative divisions 
Shemakha Governorate consisted of five counties (uezds). According to the IX Census of Russia in 1851, the population of the governorate consisted of 319,923 men and 283,083 women, in total 603,006 people. Data on the total population were provided by the Transcaucasian Office of the Imperial Ministry of Finance. It was not possible to determine the exact number of women in each uezd:

Governor-generals 

 Baron Alexander Yevstasyevich von Wrangel (1846-1850)
 Sergei Gavrilovich Chilyaev (1850-1857)
 Konstantin Davidovich Tarkhan-Mouravov (1857-1859)

Notes

References 

.
Caucasus Viceroyalty (1801–1917)
Governorates of the Caucasus
History of Baku
Modern history of Azerbaijan
19th century in Azerbaijan
States and territories established in 1846
States and territories disestablished in 1917
1846 establishments in the Russian Empire
1917 disestablishments in Russia
1846 establishments in Asia
1917 disestablishments in Asia